Plymouth-Shiloh Local School District is a public school district serving students in the villages of Plymouth and Shiloh in Richland and Huron Counties in the U.S. state of Ohio. The school district enrolls 960 students as of the 2007–2008 academic year.  The district was created in 1958 when Plymouth and Shiloh merged their districts.

Schools

Elementary schools
Plymouth-Shiloh Elementary School (Grades Pre-K through 4th)

Middle schools
Shiloh Middle School (Grades 5th through 8th)

High schools
Plymouth High School (Grades 9th through 12th)
High School Basketball Team:  State Runners-up 2009–2010 school year.

References

External links
Plymouth-Shiloh Local School District official website

Education in Richland County, Ohio
Education in Huron County, Ohio
School districts in Ohio